Nikola Mektić and Antonio Veić were the defending champions but Mektić chose to not compete
Veić chose to compete with Franko Škugor and won the title, defeating Facundo Bagnis and Julio César Campozano 7–6(7–5), 4–6, [11–9] in the final.

Seeds

Draw

Draw

References
 Main Draw

BRD Arad Challengerandnbsp;- Doubles
2013 Doubles